Peláez (meaning "son of Pelayo") is a surname of Spanish origin. It is first found in Asturias, where the Visigothic court took refuge from the Muslim occupation of Spain. It may refer to:

Aída Peláez de Villa Urrutia (1895–1923), Cuban writer, journalist and feminist activist (pen name Eugenio)
Alex Pelaez (born 1976), former Major League Baseball player
Amelia Peláez (1896–1968), Cuban painter of the Avant-garde generation
Antonio Peláez (1921–1994), Mexican painter of Spanish origin
Catalina Peláez (born 1991), Colombian squash player
Daniel Peláez Balbuena (born 1985), Peruvian footballer
Daniel Peláez Bellido (born 1986), Spanish footballer
Emmanuel Pelaez (1915–2003), politician and vice-president of the Philippines
Gonzalo Peláez (died 1138), military ruler of Asturias in the 12th century
José Manuel Peláez (born 1988), Peruvian actor
Manuel Peláez (1885–1959), Mexican military officer in the Mexican Revolution of 1910–1920
María Peláez (born 1977), Spanish butterfly swimmer
Munio Peláez (1105–1142), Galician magnate of the 12th century
Paula Peláez, Chilean Scout
Pedro Peláez (1812–1863), Filipino Catholic priest and advocate of secularization
Rachel Pelaez (born 1993), Cuban footballer
Ricardo Peláez (born 1963), Mexican footballer
Vicky Peláez (born 1956), Peruvian journalist and columnist
Wilfredo Peláez (born 1930), Uruguayan basketball player

References

Patronymic surnames
Spanish-language surnames